Vaquar Shaikh (born 9 February) is an Indian television actor. He played Rashid Ahmed Khan in Qubool Hai and has appeared in serials like Justujoo and Pradhanmantri.

Career 
Vaquar had also acted in Akbar Khan's Taj Mahal: An Eternal Love Story in 2005, in which he played the role of Dara Shikoh and two digital films - Manzar and Koyi Gawah Nahin. He is currently seen on colors Tv on the new show Vidya as a lead villain - Nanku Singh. He is a deadly villain who rules the whole village and makes the wrong use of his powers. He hails from Jalgaon, Maharashtra.

Filmography

Film

Television

Web series

References

External links

Indian male film actors
Indian male television actors
Male actors in Hindi cinema
Indian television presenters
Year of birth missing (living people)
Living people
Place of birth missing (living people)